Wolfe Tones GFC are a Gaelic Football club from Drogheda, County Louth, Ireland. The club serves the residents of St Mary's Parish in the south of Drogheda and fields Gaelic football teams in competitions organised by Louth GAA. They are one of the oldest Gaelic football clubs in County Louth. The club plays Gaelic Football at all age levels from nursery to adult

The Wolfe Tones' home ground is situated on Platin Road, beside the Boyne Valley Foods factory. The club's colours are royal blue and yellow.

History
The club was founded in 1922 by former members of the Owen Roes, a club formed in 1895 who played their football originally in the Meath Championship due to the lack of football in County Louth. Although a portion of Drogheda has always been in Meath, the only ceding of GAA county boundaries was signed off by Louth GAA in a 1979 agreement that was sanctioned in 1986 by Leinster GAA. No reasons have been publicly disclosed as to why the smallest GAA county in Ireland would give away any territory.

The newly formed Wolfe Tones waited two years until they got their first competitive match in 1924, coming against Boyne Rangers of Drogheda. It was also their first competitive win, outscoring the Rangers by 1–07 to 1–03. Before the rapid expansion of Drogheda in the 20th century, the Wolfe Tones GFC served all of the South Side of Drogheda. Before 1940 the club had won five Louth Senior Championships.

By 1980, Drogheda had four more Gaelic football clubs, St Nicholas, O'Raghallaighs, Oliver Plunketts and Naomh Mhuire. This dilution of the GAA member base in Drogheda was a factor in the decline of the club's fortunes. Consequently, Wolfe Tones GFC have competed in the Louth Junior Football Championship since the 1970s.

In recent times the club has both mens and ladies football available.

Honours
Louth Senior Football Championship: 6
1925, 1926, 1927, 1929, 1931, 1937
Cardinal O'Donnell Cup: 3
1927, 1931, 1934
McArdle Cup: 1
1962
O'Hanlon Cup: 1
1927
Feis Cup: 1
1947
Junior 2B Championship: 1
2008
Division 3B League: 1
2021
Division 3 Shield: 1
2019
Louth Minor Division 4 League: 1
2008
Louth Under 14 Championship: 1
1997
Louth Under 16 Championship: 1
1999
Louth Under 15 Division 1 League: 1
2005

In the news
http://www.dundalkdemocrat.ie/news/sport/261282/smith-sets-the-tone-against-mitchels.html
http://www.independent.ie/regionals/droghedaindependent/sport/soccer/wolfe-tones-opt-out-of-division-3-27108334.html
http://www.independent.ie/regionals/droghedaindependent/localnotes/wolfe-tones-ball-rounds-off-top-year-27132999.html
http://www.hoganstand.com/Louth/ArticleForm.aspx?ID=143903
http://www.hoganstand.com/louth/ArticleForm.aspx?ID=60647

References
www.wolfetonesgfcdrogheda.com

External links
Official Wolfe Tones GFC Webpage

Gaelic games clubs in County Louth
Gaelic football clubs in County Louth